Kuebler is a surname. Notable people with the surname include:

 Clark G. Kuebler (1908–1974), American professor and educator
 William C. Kuebler (1971–2015), American lawyer

See also
 Keble
 Kübler